Edith Nylon is a French rock band that was active from the end of the 1970s to the beginning of the 1980s and has had a revival in 2020 after a 40 year hiatus with new live shows and a new album "La Fin de la Vie Sauvage" released in 2021.

Part of the Punk movement, Edith Nylon was a precursor to new wave music.  Edith Nylon obtained a certain level of success in its time and even opened for The Police.  The singer Mylène Khaski has become a company director in Asia.

Group members 
Mylène Khaski : vocals
Christophe Boutin : guitars
Zako Khaski : guitar, bass, background vocals
Frédéric Noyé : synthesizers, piano, guitar
Karl Mormet : guitars
Albert Tauby : drums

Discography 
 1979 : Edith Nylon (CBS)
 1980 : Quatre essais philosophiques (CBS)
 1980 : Johnny Johnny (CBS)
 1982 : Echo bravo (Chiswick)

References

Much of the content of this article comes from the equivalent French-language Wikipedia article (retrieved June 9, 2006).

French punk rock groups
Musical groups from Paris